Tayyip is a Turkish given name for males. Tayyip may refer to:

 Recep Tayyip Erdoğan (born 1954), Turkish politician, and Prime Minister of the Republic of Turkey from 2003 to 2014, and current President of Turkey since 2014
Tayyip Talha Sanuç (born 1999), Turkish professional footballer

Names with the same derivation from Arabic
Tayyab
El Taib/Al Taib
Tayeb

See also

Taybeh (disambiguation)

Turkish masculine given names